Communication is usually defined as the transmission of information. The term can also refer to the message itself, or the field of inquiry studying these transmissions, also known as communication studies. There are some disagreements about the precise definition of communication - for example, whether unintentional or failed transmissions are also included and whether communication does not just transmit meaning but also create it. Models of communication aim to provide a simplified overview of its main components and their interaction. Many models include the idea that a source uses a coding system to express information in the form of a message. The source uses a channel to send the message to a receiver who has to decode it in order to understand its meaning. Channels are usually discussed in terms of the senses used to perceive the message, like hearing, sight, smell, touch, and taste.

Communication can be classified based on whether information is exchanged between humans, members of other species, or non-living entities such as computers. For human communication, a central distinction is between verbal and non-verbal communication. Verbal communication involves the exchange of messages in linguistic form. This can happen through natural languages, like English or Japanese, or through artificial languages, like Esperanto. Verbal communication includes spoken and written messages as well as the use of sign language. Non-verbal communication happens without the use of a linguistic system. There are many forms of non-verbal communication, for example, using body language, body position, touch, and intonation. Another distinction is between interpersonal and intrapersonal communication. Interpersonal communication happens between distinct individuals, such as greeting someone on the street or making a phone call. Intrapersonal communication, on the other hand, is communication with oneself. This can happen internally, as a form of inner dialog or daydreaming, or externally, for example, when writing down a shopping list or engaging in a monologue.

Non-human forms of communication include animal and plant communication. Researchers in this field often formulate additional criteria for their definition of communicative behavior, like the requirement that the behavior serves a beneficial function for natural selection or that a response to the message is observed. Animal communication plays important roles for various species in the areas of courtship and mating, parent-offspring relations, social relations, navigation, self-defense, and territoriality. In the area of courtship and mating, for example, communication is used to identify and attract potential mates. An often-discussed example concerning navigational communication is the waggle dance used by bees to indicate to other bees where flowers are located. Due to the rigid cell walls of plants, their communication often happens through chemical means rather than movement. For example, various plants, like maple trees, release so-called volatile organic compounds into the air to warn other plants of a herbivore attack. Most communication takes place between members of the same species since its purpose is usually some form of cooperation, which is not as common between species. However, there are also forms of interspecies communication, mainly in cases of symbiotic relationships. For example, many flowers use symmetrical shapes and colors that stand out from their surroundings in order to communicate to insects where nectar is located to attract them. Humans also practice interspecies communication, for example, when interacting with pets.

The field of communication includes various other issues, like communicative competence and the history of communication. Communicative competence is the ability to communicate well and applies both to the capability to formulate messages and to understand them. Two central aspects are that the communicative behavior is effective, i.e. that it achieves the individual's goal, and that it is appropriate, i.e. that it follows social standards and expectations. Human communication has a long history and how people exchange information has changed over time. These changes were usually triggered by the development of new communication technologies, such as the invention of writing systems (first pictographic and later alphabetic), the development of mass printing, the use of radio and television, and the invention of the internet.

Definitions 
The word "communication" has its root in the Latin verb "communicare", which means "to share" or "to make common". Communication is usually understood as the transmission of information. In this regard, a message is conveyed from a sender to a receiver using some form of medium, such as sound, paper, bodily movements, or electricity. In a different sense, the term "communication" can also refer just to the message that is being communicated or to the field of inquiry studying such transmissions. There is a lot of disagreement concerning the precise characterization of communication and various scholars have raised doubts that any single definition can capture the term accurately. These difficulties come from the fact that the term is applied to diverse phenomena in different contexts, often with slightly different meanings. The issue of the right definition affects the research process on many levels. This includes issues like which empirical phenomena are observed, how they are categorized, which hypotheses and laws are formulated as well as how systematic theories based on these steps are articulated. 

Some theorists, like Frank E. X. Dance, consider very broad definitions of communication that encompass unconscious and non-human behavior. In this regard, many animals communicate within their own species and even plants like flowers may be said to communicate by attracting bees. Other researchers restrict communication to conscious interactions among human beings. Some definitions focus on the use of symbols and signs while others emphasize the role of understanding, interaction, power, or transmission of ideas. Various characterizations see the communicator's intent to send a message as a central component. On this view, the transmission of information is not sufficient for communication if it happens unintentionally. One version of this view is given by Paul Grice, who identifies communication with actions that aim to make the recipient aware of the communicator's intention. One question in this regard is whether only the successful transmission of information should be regarded as communication. For example, distortion may interfere and change the actual message from what was originally intended. A closely related problem is whether acts of deliberate deception constitute communication.

According to an influential and broad definition by I. A. Richards, communication happens when one mind acts upon its environment in order to transmit its own experience to another mind. Another characterization is due to Claude Shannon and Warren Weaver. On their view, communication involves the interaction of several components, such as a source, a message, an encoder, a channel, a decoder, and a receiver. Various contemporary scholars hold that communication is not just about the transmission of information but also about creating meaning. This way, communication shapes the participant's experience by conceptualizing the world, and making sense of their environment and themselves. In regard to animal and plant communication, researchers focus less on meaning-making but often include additional requirements in their definition, for example, that the communicative behavior plays a beneficial role in natural selection or that some kind of response to the message is observed. The paradigmatic form of communication happens between two or several individuals. However, it can also take place on a larger level, for example, between organizations, social classes, or nations. Niklas Luhmann rejects the view that communication is, on its most fundamental level, an interaction between two distinct parties. Instead, he holds that "only communication can communicate" and tries to provide a conceptualization in terms of autopoietic systems without any reference to consciousness or life.

Models of communication

Models of communication are conceptual representations of the process of communication. Their goal is to provide a simplified overview of its main components. This makes it easier for researchers to formulate hypotheses, apply communication-related concepts to real-world cases, and test predictions. However, it is often argued that many models lack the conceptual complexity needed for a comprehensive understanding of all the essential aspects of communication. They are usually presented visually in the form of diagrams showing various basic components and their interaction.

Models of communication are often categorized based on their intended applications and how they conceptualize communication. Some models are general in the sense that they are intended for all forms of communication. They contrast with specialized models, which aim to describe only certain forms of communication, like models of mass communication. An influential classification distinguishes between linear transmission models, interaction models, and transaction models. Linear transmission models focus on how a sender transmits information to a receiver. They are linear because this flow of information only goes in one direction. This view is rejected by interaction models, which include a feedback loop. Feedback is required to describe many forms of communication, such as a regular conversation, where the listener may respond by expressing their opinion on the issue or by asking for clarification. For interaction models, communication is a two-way-process in which the communicators take turns in sending and receiving messages. Transaction models further refine this picture by allowing sending and responding to happen at the same time. This modification is needed, for example, to describe how the listener in a face-to-face conversation gives non-verbal feedback through their body posture and their facial expressions while the other person is talking. Transaction models also hold that meaning is produced during communication and does not exist independent of it.

All the early models, developed in the middle of the 20th century, are linear transmission models. Lasswell's model, for example, is based on five fundamental questions: "Who?", "Says What?", "In What Channel?", "To Whom?", and "With What Effect?". The goal of these questions is to identify the basic components involved in the communicative process: the sender, the message, the channel, the receiver, and the effect. Lasswell's model was initially only conceived as a model of mass communication, but it has been applied to various other fields as well. Some theorists, like Richard Braddock, have expanded it by including additional questions, like "Under What Circumstances?" and "For What Purpose?".

The Shannon–Weaver model is another influential linear transmission model. It is based on the idea that a source creates a message, which is then translated into a signal by a transmitter. Noise may interfere and distort the signal. Once the signal reaches the receiver, it is translated back into a message and made available to the destination. For a landline telephone call, the person calling is the source and their telephone is the transmitter. It translates the message into an electrical signal that travels through the wire, which acts as the channel. The person taking the call is the destination and their telephone is the receiver. The Shannon–Weaver model includes an in-depth discussion of how noise can distort the signal and how successful communication can be achieved despite noise. This can happen, for example, by making the message partially redundant so that decoding is possible nonetheless. Other influential linear transmission models include Gerbner's model and Berlo's model.

The earliest interaction model is due to Wilbur Schramm. For him, communication starts when a source has an idea and expresses it in the form of a message. This process is called encoding and happens using a code, i.e. a sign system that is able to express the idea, for example, through visual or auditory signs. The message is sent to a destination, who has to decode and interpret it in order to understand it. In response, they formulate their own idea, encode it into a message and send it back as a form of feedback. Another innovation of Schramm's model is that previous experience is necessary to be able to encode and decode messages. For communication to be successful, the fields of experience of source and destination have to overlap.

The first transactional model was proposed by Dean Barnlund. He understands communication as "the production of meaning, rather than the production of messages". Its goal is to decrease uncertainty and arrive at a shared understanding. This happens in response to external and internal cues. Decoding is the process of ascribing meaning to them and encoding consists in producing new behavioral cues as a response.

Human
There are many forms of human communication. Often discussed distinctions concern whether language is used, as in the contrast between verbal and non-verbal communication, and whether one communicates with others or with oneself, as in the contrast between interpersonal and intrapersonal communication. The field studying human communication is known as anthroposemiotics.

Mediums

Verbal 

Verbal communication is the exchange of messages in linguistic form or by means of language. Some of the difficulties in distinguishing verbal from non-verbal communication come from the difficulties in defining what exactly language means. Language is usually understood as a conventional system of symbols and rules used for communication. Such systems are based on a set of simple units of meaning that can be combined with each other to express more complex ideas. The rules for combining the units into compound expressions are called grammar. This way, words are combined to form sentences. One hallmark of human language, in contrast to animal communication, lies in its complexity and expressive power. For example, it can be used to refer not just to concrete objects in the here-and-now but also to spatially and temporally distant objects and to abstract ideas. The academic discipline studying language is called linguistics. Significant subfields include semantics (the study of meaning), morphology (the study of word formation), syntax (the study of sentence structure), pragmatics (the study of language use), and phonetics (the study of basic sounds).

A central distinction among languages is between natural and artificial or constructed languages. Natural languages, like English, Spanish, and Japanese, developed naturally and for the most part unplanned in the course of history. Artificial languages, like Esperanto, the language of first-order logic, C++, and Quenya, are purposefully designed from the ground up. Most everyday verbal communication happens using natural languages. Central forms of verbal communication are speech and writing together with their counterparts of listening and reading. Spoken languages use sounds to produce signs and transmit meaning while for writing, the signs are physically inscribed on a surface. Sign languages, like American Sign Language, are another form of verbal communication. They rely on visual means, mostly by using gestures with hands and arms, to form sentences and convey meaning. In colloquial usage, verbal communication is sometimes restricted to oral communication and may exclude writing and sign languages. However, in the academic sense, the term is usually used in a wider sense and encompasses any form of linguistic communication, independent of whether the language is expressed through speech, writing, or gestures. Humans have a natural tendency to acquire their native language in childhood. They are also able to learn other languages later in life, so-called second languages. But this process is less intuitive and often does not result in the same level of linguistic competence.

Verbal communication serves various functions. One key function is to exchange information, i.e. an attempt by the speaker to make the audience aware of something, usually of an external event. But language can also be used to express the speaker's feelings and attitudes. A closely related role is to establish and maintain social relations with other people. Verbal communication is also utilized to coordinate one's behavior with others and influence them. In some cases, language is not employed for an external purpose but only for entertainment or because it is enjoyable. One aspect of verbal communication that stands out in comparison to non-verbal communication is that it helps the communicators conceptualize the world around them and themselves. This affects how perceptions of external events are interpreted, how things are categorized, and how ideas are organized and related to each other.

Non-verbal 

Non-verbal communication is the exchange of information through non-linguistic modes, like facial expressions, gestures, and postures. However, not every form of non-verbal behavior constitutes non-verbal communication and some theorists, like Judee Burgoon, hold that the existence of a socially shared coding system for interpreting the meaning of the behavior is relevant for whether it should be regarded as non-verbal communication. A lot of non-verbal communication happens unintentionally and unconsciously, like sweating or blushing. But there are also conscious intentional forms, like shaking hands or raising a thumb. Traditionally, most research focused on verbal communication. However, this paradigm has shifted and a lot of importance is given to non-verbal communication in contemporary research. For example, many judgments about the nature and behavior of other people are based on non-verbal cues, like their facial expressions and tone of voice. Some theorists claim that the majority of the ideas and information conveyed happens this way. According to Ray Birdwhistell, for example, 65% of communication happens non-verbally. Other reasons for its significance are that it is present in almost every communicative act to some extent, that it is able to fulfill many different functions, and that certain parts of it are universally understood. It has also been suggested that human communication is at its core non-verbal and that words can only acquire meaning because of non-verbal communication. The earliest forms of human communication are non-verbal, like crying to indicate distress and later also babbling, which conveys information about the infant's health and well-being. Non-verbal communication is studied in various fields besides communication studies, like linguistics, semiotics, anthropology, and social psychology.

Non-verbal communication has many functions. It frequently contains information about emotions, attitudes, personality, interpersonal relationships, and private thoughts. It often happens simultaneously with verbal communication and helps optimize the exchange through emphasis and illustration or by adding additional information. Non-verbal cues can also clarify the intent behind a verbal message. Communication is usually more effective if several modalities are used and their messages are consistent. But in some cases, the different modalities contain conflicting messages, for example, when a person verbally agrees with a statement but presses their lips together, thereby indicating disagreement non-verbally.

There are many forms of non-verbal communication. They include kinesics, proxemics, haptics, paralanguage, chronemics, and physical appearance. Kinesics investigates the role of bodily behavior in conveying information. It is commonly referred to as body language, even though it is, strictly speaking, not a language but belongs to non-verbal communication. It includes many forms, like gestures, postures, walking styles, and dance. Facial expressions, like laughing, smiling, and frowning, all belong to kinesics and are expressive and flexible forms of communication. Oculesics is another subcategory of kinesics in regard to the eyes. It covers questions like how eye contact, gaze, blink rate, and pupil dilation form part of communication. Some kinesic patterns are inborn and involuntary, like blinking, while others are learned and voluntary, like giving a military salute. Proxemics studies how personal space is used in communication. For example, the distance between the speakers reflects their degree of familiarity and intimacy with each other as well as their social status. Haptics investigates how information is conveyed using touching behavior, like handshakes, holding hands, kissing, or slapping. Many of the meanings associated with haptics reflect care, concern, anger, and violence. For example, handshaking is often seen as a symbol of equality and fairness, while refusing to shake hands can indicate aggressiveness. Kissing is another form often used to show affection and erotic closeness.

Paralanguage, also known as vocalics, concerns the use of voice in communication. It depends on verbal communication in the form of speech but studies how something is said instead of what is said. It includes factors like articulation, lip control, rhythm, intensity, pitch, fluency, and loudness. In this regard, saying something loudly and in high pitch may convey a very different meaning than whispering the same words. Paralanguage is mainly concerned with spoken language but also includes aspects of written language, like the use of colors and fonts as well as the spatial arrangement in paragraphs and tables. Chronemics concerns the use of time, for example, what messages are sent by being on time or being late for a meeting. The physical appearance of the communicator also carries a lot of information, like height, weight, hair, skin color, gender, odors, clothing, tattooing, and piercing. It is an important factor for first impressions but is more limited as a mode of communication since it is less changeable. Some forms of non-verbal communication happen using artifacts, such as drums, smoke, batons, or traffic lights.

Channels 

For communication to be successful, the message has to travel from the sender to the receiver. The channel is the way this is accomplished. In this regard, the channel is not concerned with the meaning of the message but only with the technical means of how the meaning is conveyed. Channels are often understood in terms of the senses used to perceive the message, i.e. hearing, seeing, smelling, touching, and tasting. But in the widest sense, channels encompass any form of transmission, including technological means like books, cables, radio waves, telephones, or television. Naturally transmitted messages usually fade rapidly whereas many messages using artificial channels have a much longer lifespan, like books or sculptures.

The physical characteristics of a channel have an impact on the code and cues that can be used to express the information. For example, telephone calls are restricted to the use of verbal language and paralanguage but exclude facial expressions. It is often possible to translate messages from one code into another to make them available to a different channel, for example, by writing down words instead of speaking them or by using sign language. For many technical purposes, the choice of channels matters regarding the amount of information that can be transmitted. For example, a wired Ethernet connection may have a higher capacity for data transfer than a wireless WiFi connection, making it more suitable for transferring large amounts of data. The same is true for fiber optic cables in contrast to copper cables.

The transmission of information can occur through multiple channels at once. For example, regular face-to-face communication combines the auditory channel to convey verbal information with the visual channel transmitting non-verbal information using gestures and facial expressions. Employing multiple channels can enhance the effectiveness of communication by helping the audience better understand the subject matter. The choice of channels often matters since the receiver's ability to understand may vary depending on the chosen channel. For example, a teacher may decide to present some information orally and other information visually, depending on the content and the student's preferred learning style.

Interpersonal 

Interpersonal communication is communication between distinct individuals. Its typical form is dyadic communication between two people but it can also refer to communication within groups. It can be planned or unplanned and occurs in many different forms, like when greeting someone, during salary negotiations, or when making a phone call. Some theorists, like Virginia M. McDermott, understand interpersonal communication as a fuzzy concept that manifests in degrees. On this view, an exchange is more or less interpersonal depending on how many people are present, whether it happens face-to-face rather than through telephone or email, and whether it focuses on the relationship between the communicators. In this regard, group communication and mass communication are less typical forms of interpersonal communication and some theorists treat them as distinct types.

Various theories of the function of interpersonal communication have been proposed. Some focus on how it helps people make sense of their world and create society while others hold that its primary purpose is to understand why other people act the way they do and to adjust one's behavior accordingly. A closely related approach is to focus on information and see interpersonal communication as an attempt to reduce uncertainty about others and external events. Other explanations understand it in terms of the needs it satisfies. This includes the needs of belonging somewhere, being included, being liked, maintaining relationships, and influencing the behavior of others. On a practical level, interpersonal communication is used to coordinate one's actions with the actions of others in order to get things done. Research on interpersonal communication concerns such topics as how people build, maintain, and dissolve relationships through communication, why they choose one message rather than another, what effects these messages have on the relationship and on the individual, and how to predict whether two people would like each other.

Interpersonal communication can be synchronous or asynchronous. For asynchronous communication, the different parties take turns in sending and receiving messages. An example would be the exchange of letters or emails. For synchronous communication, both parties send messages at the same time. This happens, for example, when one person is talking while the other person sends non-verbal messages in response signaling whether they agree with what is being said. Some theorists, like Sarah Trenholm and Arthur Jensen, distinguish between content messages and relational messages. Content messages express the speaker's feelings toward the topic of discussion. Relational messages, on the other hand, demonstrate the speaker's feelings toward their relationship with the other participants.

Intrapersonal 

Intrapersonal communication is communication with oneself. In some cases this manifests externally, like when engaged in a monologue, taking notes, highlighting a passage, and writing a diary or a shopping list. But many forms of intrapersonal communication happen internally in the form of inner dialog, like when thinking about something or daydreaming. 

Intrapersonal communication serves various functions. As a form of inner dialog, it is usually triggered by external events and may happen in the form of articulating a phrase before expressing it externally, planning for the future, or as an attempt to process emotions when trying to calm oneself down in stressful situations. It can help regulate one's own mental activity and outward behavior as well as internalize cultural norms and ways of thinking. External forms of intrapersonal communication can aid one's memory, like when making a shopping list, help unravel difficult problems, as when solving a complex mathematical equation line by line, and internalize new knowledge, like when repeating new vocabulary to oneself. Because of these functions, intrapersonal communication can be understood as "an exceptionally powerful and pervasive tool for thinking."

Based on its role in self-regulation, some theorists have suggested that intrapersonal communication is more fundamental than interpersonal communication. This is based on the observation that young children sometimes use egocentric speech while playing in an attempt to direct their own behavior. On this view, interpersonal communication only develops later when the child moves from their early egocentric perspective to a more social perspective. Other theorists contend that interpersonal communication is more basic. They explain this by arguing that language is used first by parents to regulate what their child does. Once the child has learned this, it can apply the same technique on itself to get more control over its own behavior.

Contexts and purposes 
There are countless other categorizations of communication besides the types discussed so far. They often focus on the context, purpose, and topic of communication. For example, organizational communication concerns communication between members of organizations such as corporations, nonprofits, or small businesses. Central in this regard is the coordination of the behavior of the different members as well as the interaction with customers and the general public. Closely related terms are business communication, corporate communication, professional communication, and workspace communication. Political communication is communication in relation to politics. It covers topics like electoral campaigns to influence the voters and legislative communication, like letters to a congress or committee documents. Specific emphasis is often given to propaganda and the role of mass media. Intercultural communication is relevant to both organizational and political communication since they often involve attempts to exchange messages between communicators from different cultural backgrounds. In this context, it is crucial to avoid misunderstandings since the cultural background affects how messages are formulated and interpreted. This is also relevant for development communication, which is concerned with the use of communication for assisting in development, specifically concerning aid given by first-world countries to third-world countries. Another significant field is health communication, which is about communication in the field of healthcare and health promotion efforts. A central topic in this field is how healthcare providers, like doctors and nurses, should communicate with their patients.

Many other types of communication are discussed in the academic literature. They include international communication, non-violent communication, strategic communication, military communication, aviation communication, risk communication, defensive communication, upward communication, interdepartmental communication, scientific communication, environmental communication, and agricultural communication.

Other species

Besides human communication, there are many other forms of communication found, for example, in the animal kingdom and among plants. The field of inquiry studying these forms of communication is called biosemiotics. There are additional difficulties in this field for judging whether communication has taken place between two individuals. For example, acoustic signals are often easy to notice and analyze for scientists but additional difficulties come when judging whether tactile or chemical changes should be understood as communicative signals rather than as other biological processes.

For this reason, researchers often use slightly altered definitions of communication in order to facilitate their work. A common assumption in this regard comes from evolutionary biology and holds that communication should somehow benefit the communicators in terms of natural selection. In this regard, "communication can be defined as the exchange of information between individuals, wherein both the signaller and receiver may expect to benefit from the exchange." So the sender should benefit by influencing the receiver's behavior and the receiver should benefit by responding to the signal. It is often held that these benefits should exist on average but not necessarily in every single case. This way, deceptive signaling can also be understood as a form of communication. One problem with the evolutionary approach is that it is often very difficult to assess the influence of such behavior on natural selection. Another common pragmatic constraint is to hold that it is necessary to observe a response by the receiver following the signal when judging whether communication has occurred.

Animals
Animal communication is the process of giving and taking information among animals. The field studying animal communication is called zoosemiotics. There are many parallels to human communication. For example, humans and many animals express sympathy by synchronizing their movements and postures. Nonetheless, there are also significant differences, like the fact that humans also engage in verbal communication while animal communication is restricted to non-verbal communication. Some theorists have tried to distinguish human from animal communication based on the claim that animal communication lacks a referential function and is thus not able to refer to external phenomena. However, this view is often rejected, especially for higher animals. A different approach is to draw the distinction based on the complexity of human language, especially its almost limitless ability to combine basic units of meaning into more complex meaning structures. For example, it has been argued that recursion is a property of human language that sets it apart from all non-human communicative systems. Another difference is that human communication is frequently associated with a conscious intention to send information, which is often not discernable for animal communication.

Animal communication can take a variety of forms, including visual, auditory, tactile, olfactory, and gustatory communication. Visual communication happens in the form of movements, gestures, facial expressions, and colors, like movements seen during mating rituals, the colors of birds, and the rhythmic light of fireflies. Auditory communication takes place through vocalizations by species like birds, primates, and dogs. It is frequently used to alert and warn. Lower animals often have very simple response patterns to auditory messages, reacting either by approach or avoidance. More complex response patterns are observed for higher species, which may use different signals for different types of predators and responses. For example, certain primates use different signals for airborne and land predators. Tactile communication occurs through touch, vibration, stroking, rubbing, and pressure. It is especially relevant for parent-young relations, courtship, social greetings, and defense. Olfactory and gustatory communication happens chemically through smells and tastes. 

There are huge differences between species concerning what functions communication plays, how much it is realized, and the behavior through which they communicate. Common functions include the fields of courtship and mating, parent-offspring relations, social relations, navigation, self-defense, and territoriality. One part of courtship and mating consists in identifying and attracting potential mates. This can happen through songs, like grasshoppers and crickets, chemically through pheromones, like moths, and through visual messages by flashing light, like fireflies. For many species, the offspring depends for its survival on the parent. One central function of parent-offspring communication is to recognize each other. In some cases, the parents are also able to guide the offspring's behavior. Social animals, like chimpanzees, bonobos, wolves, and dogs, engage in various forms of communication to express their feelings and build relations. Navigation concerns the movement through space in a purposeful manner, e.g. to locate food, avoid enemies, and follow a colleague. In bats, this happens through echolocation, i.e. by sending auditory signals and processing the information from the echoes. Bees are another often-discussed case in this respect since they perform a dance to indicate to other bees where flowers are located. In regard to self-defense, communication is used to warn others and to assess whether a costly fight can be avoided. Another function of communication is to mark and claim certain territories used for food and mating. For example, some male birds claim a hedge or part of a meadow by using songs to keep other males away and attract females.

Two competing theories in the study of animal communication are nature theory and nurture theory. Their conflict concerns to what extent animal communication is programmed into the genes as a form of adaptation rather than learned from previous experience as a form of conditioning. To the degree that it is learned, it usually happens through imprinting, i.e. as a form of learning that only happens in a certain phase and is then mostly irreversible.

Plants, fungi, and bacteria
Plant communication refers to plant processes involving the sending and receiving of information. The field studying plant communication is called phytosemiotics. This field poses additional difficulties for researchers since plants are very different from humans and other animals: they lack a central nervous system and have rigid cell walls. These walls restrict movement and make it impossible for plants to send or receive signals that depend on rapid movement. However, there are various similarities as well since plants face many of the same challenges as other animals, like finding resources, avoiding predators and pathogens as well as finding mates and ensuring that their offspring survives. Many of the evolutionary responses to these challenges are analogous to those in animals but are implemented using different means. One crucial difference is that chemical communication is much more prominent for plant communication in contrast to the importance of visual and auditory communication for animals.

Communication is a form of behavior. In regard to plants, the term behavior is usually not defined in terms of physical movement, as is the case for animals, but as a biochemical response to a stimulus. This response has to be short relative to the plant's lifespan. Communication is a special form of behavior that involves conveying information from a sender to a receiver and is distinguished from other types of behavior, like defensive reactions and mere sensing. Theorists usually include additional requirements, like that there is some form of response in the receiver and that the communicative behavior benefits both sender and receiver in terms of natural selection. Richard Karban distinguishes three steps of plant communication: the emission of a cue by a sender, the perception of the cue by a receiver, and their response. It is not relevant to what extent the emission of a cue is intentional but it should be possible for the receiver to ignore the signal.

Plant communication happens in various forms. It includes communication within plants, i.e. within plant cells and between plant cells, between plants of the same or related species, and between plants and non-plant organisms, especially in the root zone. Plant roots also communicate with rhizome bacteria, fungi, and insects within the soil. A prominent form of communication is airborne and happens through so-called volatile organic compounds (VOCs). For example, many plants, like maple trees, release VOCs when they are attacked by a herbivore to warn neighboring plants, which then react accordingly by adjusting their defenses. Another form of plant-to-plant communication happens through mycorrhizal fungi. These fungi form underground networks, sometimes referred to as the Wood-Wide Web, and connect the roots of different plants. The plants use the network to send messages to each other, specifically to warn other plants of a pest attack and to help prepare their defenses.

Communication can also be observed for fungi and bacteria. Some fungal species communicate by releasing pheromones into the external environment. For example, they are used to promote sexual interaction (mating) in several aquatic fungal species, like Allomyces macrogynus, the Mucorales fungus Mucor mucedo, Neurospora crassa and the yeasts Saccharomyces cerevisiae, Schizosaccharomyces pombe, and Rhodosporidium toruloides. One form of communication between bacteria is called quorum sensing. It happens by releasing hormone-like molecules, which other bacteria detect and respond to. This process is used to monitor the environment for other bacteria and to coordinate population-wide responses, for example, by sensing the density of bacteria and regulating gene expression accordingly. Other possible responses include the induction of bioluminescence and the formation of biofilms.

Interspecies 
Most communication happens between members within a species as a form of intraspecies communication. This is because the purpose of communication is usually some form of cooperation, which happens mostly within a species while different species are often in conflict with each other in their competition over resources. However, there are also some forms of interspecies communication. This occurs especially when there are symbiotic relationships and significantly less for parasitic or predator-prey relationships.

Interspecies communication plays a key role for various plants that depend for their reproduction on external agents. For example, flowers need insects for pollination and provide resources like nectar and other rewards in return. They use various forms of communication to signal their benefits and attract visitors, for example, by using colors that stand out from their surroundings and by using symmetrical shapes. This form of advertisement is necessary since different flowers compete for potential visitors. Many fruit-bearing plants rely on plant-to-animal communication to disperse their seeds and move them to a favorable location. This happens by providing nutritious fruits to animals. The seeds are eaten together with the fruit and are later excreted at a different location. Communication is central to make the animals aware of where the fruits are and whether they are ripe. For many fruits, this happens through their color: they have an inconspicuous green color until they ripen and take on a new color that stands in visual contrast to the environment. Another example of interspecies communication is found in the ant-plant relationship. It concerns, for example, the selection of seeds by ants for their ant gardens and the pruning of exogenous vegetation as well as plant protection by ants.

Several animal species also engage in interspecies communication, like apes, whales, dolphins, elephants, and dogs. For example, different species of monkeys use common signals to cooperate when threatened by a common predator. An example of interspecies communication involving humans is found in their relation to pets. For example, acoustic signals play a central role in communication with dogs. Dogs are able to learn to respond to various commands, like "sit" and "come". They can even learn short syntactic combinations, like "bring X" or "put X in a box". They also react to the pitch and frequency of the human voice by reading off information about emotions, dominance, and uncertainty. Humans can understand dog signals in the form of interpreting and reacting to their emotions, such as aggressiveness, fearfulness, and playfulness.

Computer 

Computer communication concerns the exchange of data between computers and similar devices. For this to be possible, the devices have to be connected through a transmission system that forms a network between them. To access the transmission system, a transmitter is required to send messages and a receiver is required to receive them. For example, a personal computer may use a modem as a transmitter to send information to a server through the public telephone network as the transmission system. The server may use a modem as its receiver. To transmit the data, it has to be converted into an electric signal. Communication channels used for transmission are either analog or digital and are characterized by features like bandwidth and latency.

There are many different forms of computer networks. The most commonly discussed ones are LANs and WANs. LAN stands for local area network, which are computer networks within a limited area, usually with a distance of less than one kilometer. For example, connecting two computers within a home or an office building is a form of LAN. This can happen using a wired connection, like Ethernet, or a wireless connection, like WiFi. WANs, on the other hand, are wide area networks that span large geographical regions, like the internet. They may use several intermediate connection nodes to link the different endpoints. Further types of computer networks include PANs (personal area networks), CANs (campus area networks), and MANs (Metropolitan area networks).

For computer communication to be successful, the involved devices have to follow a common set of conventions governing their exchange. These conventions are known as the communication protocol and concern various aspects of the exchange, like the format of the data exchanged, how to respond to transmission errors, and how the two systems are synchronized, for example, how the receiver identifies the start and end of a signal. A significant distinction in this regard is between simplex, half-duplex, and full-duplex systems. For simplex systems, signals flow only in one direction from the sender to the receiver, like in radio, television, or screens displaying arrivals and departures at airports. Half-duplex systems allow two-way exchanges but signals can only flow in one direction at a time, like walkie-talkies or police radios. In the case of full-duplex systems, signals can flow in both directions at the same time, like regular telephone and internet. In either case, it is often important that the connection is secure to ensure that the transmitted data reaches only the intended destination and not an unauthorized third party.

Human-computer communication is a closely related field that concerns the question of how humans interact with computers. This happens through a user interface, which includes the hardware used to interact with the computer, like mouse, keyboard, and monitor, as well as the software used in the process. On the software side, most early user interfaces were command-line interfaces in which the user has to type a command to interact with the computer. Most modern user interfaces are graphical user interfaces, like Microsoft Windows and macOS. They involve various graphical elements through which the user can interact with the computer, like icons representing files and folders as well as buttons used to trigger commands. They are usually much easier to use for non-experts. One aim when designing user interfaces is to simplify the interaction with computers. This helps make them more user-friendly and accessible to a wider audience while also increasing productivity.

Communication studies

Communication studies, also referred to as communication science, is the academic discipline studying communication. It is closely related to semiotics, with one difference being that communication studies focuses more on technical questions of how messages are sent, received, and processed while semiotics tackles more abstract questions in relation to meaning and hows signs acquire meaning. Communication studies covers a wide area overlapping with many other disciplines, such as biology, anthropology, psychology, sociology, linguistics, media studies, and journalism.

Many contributions in the field of communication studies focus on developing models and theories of communication. Models of communication aim to give a simplified overview of the main components involved in communication. Theories of communication, on the other hand, try to provide conceptual frameworks to accurately present communication in all its complexity. Other topics in communication studies concern the function and effects of communication, like satisfying physiological and psychological needs and building relationships as well as gathering information about the environment, others, and oneself. A further issue concerns the question of how communication systems change over time and how these changes correlate with other societal changes. A related question focuses on psychological principles underlying those changes and the effects they have on how people exchange ideas.

Communication was already studied as early as Ancient Greece. Influential early theories are due to Plato and Aristotle, who emphasized public speaking and the understanding of rhetoric. For example, Aristotle held that the goal of communication is to persuade the audience. However, the field of communication studies only became a separate research discipline in the 20th century, especially starting in the 1940s. The development of new communication technologies, such as telephone, radio, newspapers, television, and the internet, has had a big impact on communication and communication studies. Today, communication studies is a wide discipline that includes many subfields dedicated to topics like interpersonal and intrapersonal communication, verbal and non-verbal communication, group communication, organizational communication, political communication, intercultural communication, mass communication, persuasive communication, and health communication. Some works in communications studies try to provide a very general characterization of communication in the widest sense while others attempt to give a precise analysis of a specific form of communication.

Communicative competence 

Communicative competence is the ability to communicate effectively or to choose the appropriate communicative behavior in a given situation. It concerns several aspects, like what to say and how to say it as well as when to say it. It includes both the capability to send messages as well as to receive and understand them. Competence is often used as a synonym for ability and contrasted with performance: competence can be present even if it is not exercised while performance consists in the realization of this competence. However, some theorists reject this distinction and hold instead that whether the behavior is actually performed is highly relevant for whether the competence is possessed. On this view, performance is the observable part and is used to infer competence in relation to future performances. Some researchers define communicative competence subjectively as the individual's perception of their performance, i.e. whether they managed to realize their own goals. A different approach is to understand it more objectively, judged from the perspective of an observer concerning whether a person meets certain social expectations. These two perspectives are not mutually exclusive and can be combined by achieving one's personal goals while doing so in a socially appropriate manner.

In this regard, there are two central components to communicative competence: effectiveness and appropriateness. Effectiveness is the degree to which the speaker achieves their desired outcomes or the degree to which preferred alternatives are realized. This means that whether a communicative behavior is effective does not just depend on the actual outcome but also on the speaker's intention, i.e. whether this outcome was what they intended to achieve. Because of this, some theorists additionally require that the speaker has a certain background knowledge of what they were doing and should therefore be able to give an explanation of why they engaged in one behavior rather than another. Effectiveness is closely related to efficiency but not identical to it. The difference is that effectiveness is about achieving goals while efficiency is about using few resources (such as time, effort, and money) in the process. Appropriateness means that the communicative behavior meets certain social standards and expectations. It is "the perceived legitimacy or acceptability of behavior or enactments in a given context". This means that the speaker is aware of the social and cultural context in order to adapt and express the message in a way that is considered acceptable in the given situation. For example, to bid farewell to their teacher, a student may use the expression "Goodbye, sir" but not the expression "I gotta split, man", which they may use when talking to a peer. To be both effective and appropriate means to achieve one's preferred outcomes in a way that follows social standards and expectations.

Many additional components of communicative competence have been suggested, such as empathy, control, flexibility, sensitivity, and knowledge. It is often discussed in terms of the individual communications skills employed in the process, i.e. the specific behavioral components that make up communicative competence. They include nonverbal communication skills and conversation skills as well as message
production and reception skills. Examples of message production skills are speaking and writing while listening and reading are the corresponding reception skills. On a purely linguistic level, communicative competence involves a proper understanding of a language, including its phonology, orthography, syntax, lexicon, and semantics. It impacts many aspects of the individual's life that depend on successful communication, like ensuring basic necessities of survival as well as building and maintaining relationships. Communicative competence is a key factor regarding whether a person is able to reach their goals in social life, like having a successful career or finding a suitable spouse. Because of this, it can have a big impact on the individual's well-being. The lack of communicative competence, on the other hand, can cause various problems both on the individual and the societal level, including professional, academic, and health problems.

Barriers to effective communication 
Barriers to effective communication can distort the message. This may result in failed communication and cause undesirable effects. Potential sources of distortion include filtering, selective perception, information overload, emotions, communication apprehension, and gender differences. Noise is another negative factor. It concerns influences that interfere with the message on its way to the receiver and distort it. For example, crackling sounds during a telephone call are one form of noise. Ambiguous expressions can also inhibit effective communication and make it necessary to disambiguate between the possible interpretation to discern the sender's intention. These interpretations depend also on the cultural background of the participants. Significant cultural differences constitute additional difficulties and make it more likely that messages are misinterpreted.

History 

The history of communication investigates how communicative processes evolved and interacted with society, culture, and technology. Human communication has a long history and the way people communicate has changed a lot in the process. Many of these changes were triggered by the development of new communication technology and had various effects on how people exchanged ideas. In the academic literature, the history of communication is usually divided into different ages based on the dominant form of communication in that age. There are some disagreements about the number of ages and the precise periodization but they usually include ages for speaking, writing, and print as well as electronic mass communication and the internet. According to Marshall Poe, the different dominant media for each age can be characterized in relation to accessibility (cost of using the medium), privacy (cost of hiding data from third parties), fidelity (degree to which the medium can express information), volume (amount of data that can be transmitted), velocity (the time it takes to transmit), range (the maximum distance between sender and receiver), persistence (the time the data remains intact), and searchability (how easy it is to find data). Poe argues that subsequent ages usually involve some form of improvement in regard to these characteristics.

In early societies, spoken language was the primary form of communication. Most knowledge was passed on through it, often in the form of stories or wise sayings. One problem with this form is that it does not produce stable knowledge since it depends on imperfect human memory. Because of this, many details differ from one telling to the next and are presented differently by distinct storytellers. As people started to settle and form agricultural communities, societies grew and there was an increased need for stable records of ownership of land and commercial transactions. This triggered the invention of writing, which is able to solve many of these problems of oral communication. It is much more efficient at preserving knowledge and passing it on between generations since it does not depend on human memory.

Most early written communication happened through pictograms. Pictograms are graphical symbols that convey meaning by visually resembling real world objects. The first complex pictographic writing system was developed around 3500 BCE by the Sumerians and is called cuneiform. Pictograms are still in use today, like no-smoking signs and the symbols of male and female figures on bathroom doors. A significant disadvantage of pictographic writing systems is that they require a huge amount of symbols to refer to all the objects one wants to talk about. This problem was solved by the development of alphabetic writing systems, which dominate to this day. Their symbols do not stand for regular objects but for the basic units of sound used in spoken language, so-called phonemes. Another drawback of early forms of writing, like the clay tablets used for cuneiform, was that they were not very portable. This made it difficult to transport the texts from one location to another to share the information. This changed with the invention of papyrus by the Egyptians around 2500 BCE and was further improved later by the development of parchment and paper.

Until the 1400s, almost all written communication was done by hand. Because of this, the spread of writing within society was still rather limited since the cost of copying books by hand was relatively high. The introduction and popularization of mass printing in the middle of the 15th century by Johann Gutenberg resulted in rapid changes in this regard. It quickly increased the circulation of written media and also led to the dissemination of new forms of written documents, like newspapers and pamphlets. One side effect was that the augmented availability of written documents significantly improved the general literacy of the population. This development served as the foundation for revolutions in various fields, including science, politics, and religion.

Scientific discoveries in the 19th and 20th centuries caused many further developments in the history of communication. They include the invention of telegraphs and telephones, which made it even easier and faster to transmit information from one location to another without the need to transport written documents. These communication forms were initially limited to cable connections, which had to be established first. Later developments found ways of wireless transmission using radio signals. They made it possible to reach wide audiences and radio soon became one of the central forms of mass communication. Various innovations in the field of photography enabled the recording of images on film, which led to the development of cinema and television. The reach of wireless communication was further enhanced with the development of satellites, which made it possible to broadcast radio and television signals to different stations all over the world. This way, information could be shared almost instantly everywhere around the globe. The development of the internet constitutes a further milestone in the history of communication. It made it easier than ever before for people to exchange ideas, collaborate, and access information from anywhere in the world by using a variety of means, such as websites, e-mail, social media, and video conferences.

See also

References

Works cited

External links
 
 

Communication
Main topic articles